WBGG (970 kHz) is a commercial AM radio station in Pittsburgh, Pennsylvania.  It carries a sports format and is owned by iHeartMedia, Inc.  Local sports hosts are heard weekdays from noon to 7 p.m.  Other times, ESPN Radio programming is heard.  The studios and offices are located in Green Tree.

WBGG transmits with 5,000 watts, but to avoid interfering with other stations on 970 AM is uses a directional antenna at all times.  By day a four-tower array is employed and at night, it switches to an eight-tower array.  The transmitter is off McKnight Road in Ross Township, Pennsylvania.

History

Beginnings as WWSW
The station was originally at 1500 (later 1490), and moved to 970 in November 1949, requiring an eight-tower array to use the frequency.  This large array was one of the first of its kind in the United States.

For many years, this station was WWSW with a MOR music format aimed at older adults.  In the early 1970s, General Manager Charles Warner instituted a news-heavy morning show to compete with market leader KDKA.

Country, Talk and Oldies
In 1980, two format changes were instituted at WWSW and its sister station, known for the past seven years at WPEZ.  The latter switched from Top 40 to adult contemporary music and proved to be a blueprint for its present-day success.  As for the former, a disastrous and abrupt format change to country music (as "Double Country") eventually resulted in the abandonment of the historic call letters and a switch to talk as WTKN, with the moniker "We're Talking Pittsburgh!"  Legendary Pittsburgh air personality Doug "Uncle Dougie" Hoerth was among the staff hosts under this format, which proved to be no match for the higher rated KDKA and WTAE.

Later, the WWSW calls were reclaimed.  In February 1988, WWSW and sister WWSW-FM simultaneously switched to separate oldies formats, with the FM concentrating more on hits of the 1960s and 1970s, while the AM focused on 1950s and 1960s music. By 1991, the AM became a complete simulcast of the FM station, known as “3WS”, by the end of the decade.

As WBGG
On August 28, 2000, 970 switched call letters to WBGG, breaking away from the simulcast to become a Fox Sports Radio affiliate.  At first, the station was known as "970 The Burgh," but today, the station calls itself "970 ESPN", as it is now an affiliate of ESPN Radio.

The two stations had a common bond as, in addition to being co-owned, they were the flagship stations for the Pittsburgh Penguins. The FM outlet for Penguins switched to sister station WXDX-FM in the 2006-07 hockey season while University of Pittsburgh football and basketball switched to WWSW.

In addition, WBGG, along with sister station WDVE, is the flagship station for the Pittsburgh Steelers. While WDVE originates the broadcast, the contract with the Steelers specifies that the games also be aired on an AM radio station in the market.

Local programming was highlighted by former Steelers Tunch Ilkin and Craig Wolfley 10a-12p, Stan Savran 12-2p, and Wes Uhler from 4-7p.

The online publication (970espn.com) is also the home of several sports blogs including the "Pens Bender Blog" by Rich Miller.

On January 1, 2011 WBGG became an affiliate of the ESPN Radio Network as WEAE changed to Radio Disney.

On September 9, 2015 it was announced that WBGG Pittsburgh launched an FM translator station, W292DH, located at 106.3, licensed to Uniontown. That translator was sold late in 2020 to Catholic broadcaster Relevant Radio.

Since 2013, WBGG has been the flagship station in the Pittsburgh area for the Robert Morris Colonials football, men's basketball, and men's ice hockey teams, as well as select women's basketball and women's ice hockey games. The station also broadcasts the weekly football coach's show with head coach Bernard Clark Jr. every Thursday night during college football season, men's basketball coach's show with head coach Andrew Toole every Wednesday night during college basketball season, and men's hockey coach's show with head coach Derek Schooley every Tuesday night during college hockey season.

The station also broadcasts The Keith Dambrot Show, a weekly show featuring Duquesne men's basketball head coach Keith Dambrot.

During the season for the NHL's Pittsburgh Penguins, the station broadcasts a weekly Monday night show called Along the Boards, hosted by Pittsburgh Post-Gazette Penguins beat writer Jason Mackey and Penguins radio color analyst and former player Phil Bourque.

References

External links
ESPN Pittsburgh Facebook
Official website

Sports radio stations in the United States
BGG
Radio stations established in 1931
1931 establishments in Pennsylvania
IHeartMedia radio stations
ESPN Radio stations